Rahotu is a community in the west of Taranaki, in the North Island of New Zealand. It is located on State Highway 45, 16 kilometres north of Ōpunake and 11 km south of Warea.

History
In 1826, on the eastern side of Rahotu, a pā of the Ngāti Maru was the site of a battle with Waikato Māori.

On 29 April 1834, a 240-ton barque called Harriet was wrecked off the coast near Rahotu, and some of the crew including the captain's wife and two young children were captured by local Māori. They were rescued by HMS Alligator five months later. The Harriet's anchor is displayed outside the Rahotu Hotel.

A constabulary camp was formed at Rahotu in 1881 and a telegraph station established.

The current town was settled in the 1880s and was well established by the early 20th century.

Demographics
The SA1 area is part of the larger Cape Egmont statistical area.

Rahotu had a population of 216 at the 2018 New Zealand census, an increase of 24 people (12.5%) since the 2013 census, and a decrease of 6 people (−2.7%) since the 2006 census. There were 84 households, comprising 108 males and 108 females, giving a sex ratio of 1.0 males per female. The median age was 37.5 years (compared with 37.4 years nationally), with 57 people (26.4%) aged under 15 years, 33 (15.3%) aged 15 to 29, 108 (50.0%) aged 30 to 64, and 18 (8.3%) aged 65 or older.

Ethnicities were 77.8% European/Pākehā, 47.2% Māori, 1.4% Pacific peoples, and 2.8% other ethnicities. People may identify with more than one ethnicity.

Although some people chose not to answer the census's question about religious affiliation, 54.2% had no religion, 31.9% were Christian, 1.4% had Māori religious beliefs and 1.4% had other religions.

Of those at least 15 years old, 12 (7.5%) people had a bachelor's or higher degree, and 60 (37.7%) people had no formal qualifications. The median income was $22,200, compared with $31,800 nationally. 9 people (5.7%) earned over $70,000 compared to 17.2% nationally. The employment status of those at least 15 was that 66 (41.5%) people were employed full-time, 39 (24.5%) were part-time, and 9 (5.7%) were unemployed.

Cape Egmont statistical area

Cape Egmont had a population of 2,067 at the 2018 New Zealand census, a decrease of 39 people (−1.9%) since the 2013 census, and a decrease of 33 people (−1.6%) since the 2006 census. There were 774 households, comprising 1,107 males and 960 females, giving a sex ratio of 1.15 males per female. The median age was 34.1 years (compared with 37.4 years nationally), with 561 people (27.1%) aged under 15 years, 378 (18.3%) aged 15 to 29, 963 (46.6%) aged 30 to 64, and 168 (8.1%) aged 65 or older.

Ethnicities were 81.9% European/Pākehā, 28.2% Māori, 1.5% Pacific peoples, 2.3% Asian, and 2.6% other ethnicities. People may identify with more than one ethnicity.

The percentage of people born overseas was 7.1, compared with 27.1% nationally.

Although some people chose not to answer the census's question about religious affiliation, 56.0% had no religion, 31.9% were Christian, 1.5% had Māori religious beliefs, 0.6% were Buddhist and 1.5% had other religions.

Of those at least 15 years old, 174 (11.6%) people had a bachelor's or higher degree, and 399 (26.5%) people had no formal qualifications. The median income was $32,400, compared with $31,800 nationally. 180 people (12.0%) earned over $70,000 compared to 17.2% nationally. The employment status of those at least 15 was that 810 (53.8%) people were employed full-time, 267 (17.7%) were part-time, and 57 (3.8%) were unemployed.

Education
Rahotu School is a coeducational full primary (years 1-8) school  with a roll of  students as of  The school was founded in 1884, with a second classroom added in 1908, and substantial expansion in 1953.

Notes

External links
 Rahotu School website

South Taranaki District
Populated places in Taranaki